Yoo Il-ho (born 30 March 1955) is a South Korean politician. He was the acting Prime Minister of South Korea, following Hwang Kyo-ahn's resignation from 11 May 2017 until 31 May 2017. Yoo had also served as Deputy Prime Minister and Minister of Finance.

References

1955 births
Deputy Prime Ministers of South Korea
Finance ministers of South Korea
Living people
Members of the National Assembly (South Korea)
Seoul National University alumni
University of Pennsylvania alumni
21st-century South Korean politicians